Year 195 (CXCV) was a common year starting on Wednesday (link will display the full calendar) of the Julian calendar. At the time, it was known as the Year of the Consulship of Scrapula and Clemens (or, less frequently, year 948 Ab urbe condita). The denomination 195 for this year has been used since the early medieval period, when the Anno Domini calendar era became the prevalent method in Europe for naming years.

Events 
 By place 
 Roman Empire 
 Emperor Septimius Severus has the Roman Senate deify the previous emperor Commodus, in an attempt to gain favor with the family of Marcus Aurelius.
 King Vologases V and other eastern princes support the claims of Pescennius Niger. The Roman province of Mesopotamia rises in revolt with Parthian support. Severus marches to Mesopotamia to battle the Parthians.
 The Roman province of Syria is divided and the role of Antioch is diminished. The Romans annexed the Syrian cities of Edessa and Nisibis. Severus re-establish his headquarters and the colonies there.
 Lucius Septimius Bassianus (or Caracalla), age 7, changes his name to Marcus Aurelius Antoninus, to solidify connections with the family of Marcus Aurelius, and is given the title Caesar.   
 Clodius Albinus, who had been proclaimed emperor in Britain, crosses into Gaul with his legions, while at the same time recruiting new soldiers. He is soon the head of an army of 150,000 men, according to Cassius Dio. Severus, still in Mesopotamia, hastily returns to Rome.  
 The denarius is devalued by Severus. The coin now contains only 50% precious metal.

 China 
 In China, the Xiongnu federation crosses the Great Wall and establishes itself in Shanxi Province.
 Last (2nd) year of the Xingping era during the Han Dynasty.

Births 
 Cao Biao (or Zhuhu), Chinese imperial prince (d. 251)
 Gong Lu (or Dexu), Chinese official and politician (d. 225)
 He Yan (or Pingshu), Chinese official and philosopher (d. 249)
 Wang Su, Chinese official and Confucian scholar (d. 256)

Deaths 
 Fan Chou, Chinese general and politician
 Huangfu Song (or Yizhen), Chinese general
 Liu Yao, Chinese warlord and governor (b. 157)
 Lu Kang (or Jining), Chinese politician (b. 126)
 Xu Shao (or Zijiang), Chinese official (b. 150)
 Ze Rong, Chinese warlord and Buddhist leader
 Zhang Miao, Chinese warlord and official 
 Zhu Jun, Chinese general and official

References